KRAV is the main Swedish organization that develops and maintains regulations for ecological sustainable agriculture, founded in 1985 by a consortium of organic producers.

KRAV is a member of International Federation of Organic Agriculture Movements.

References

External links
 (English)

Organic farming in Sweden
Organic farming organizations
Environmental organizations based in Sweden